The Los Angeles City Marshal was the chief law enforcement officer of Los Angeles in the city's early years.

The City Marshal was an office created in 1850 upon the city's incorporation. The title was City Marshal, Tax and Licence Collector.  The title of Chief of Police was added in 1871.  In 1876 the position of City Marshal was eliminated.  Jacob F. Gerkens as the first officer to hold the new title of Chief of Police.  J.J. Carrillo continued as Tax and Licence Collector in 1876 - 1877.

The second City Marshal, Jack Whaling, was shot in 1853. This led to the creation of the "Los Angeles Rangers", a volunteer force who assisted the City Marshal and County Sheriff. At this time, law enforcement was limited and the Marshal had use of but one small county jail.

In 1869, William C. Warren was appointed as City Marshal and was given command over a force of six officers. He was responsible for being the city's dog catcher and collecting taxes. He was paid 2.5% of all tax monies he collected (in 1875 it totaled to $115 per month). In 1872, a city ordinance was passed which required the city marshal to register and license dogs.

Notes

 Beard was removed from office.
 Getman was killed in 1858 after being elected as sheriff of Los Angeles County.
 Warren was shot and killed in 1870 by one of his deputies, Joseph Franklin Dye.

Bibliography

References

Government of Los Angeles
History of Los Angeles